Miss World Ireland is a national Beauty pageant in Ireland. Winners of the competition represent Ireland at Miss World. Among the winners are Rosanna Davison, who went on to win Miss World 2003, and Pamela Uba, who in 2021 became the first black woman to win the Miss Ireland title.

History
The first winner of Miss Ireland was Violet Nolan in 1947. The next winner, Eithne Dunne, came 5 years later in 1952. Thereafter there has been a winner every year except 2020, when the competetion was cancelled due to the worldwide COVID-19 pandemic.

In 2003 the winner, Rosanna Davison, went on to win Miss World 2003.

In 2012 the winner Marie Hughes, representing Mayo, was stripped of her title when it was discovered that she was "too old", as she was aged 25 and would have been 26 at the time of the Miss World competition. She was replaced by the runner-up, Rebecca Maguire, aged 20.

In 2021, following the cancellation of the competition the previous year due to the COVID-19 pandemic, Pamela Uba became the first black woman to win the Miss Ireland title.

Titleholders
Color key

See also 
 Alternative Miss Ireland
 Miss Northern Ireland
 Miss Universe Ireland

References

Pageant News
Miss Ireland Website
Jakki Moore
Nuala Holloway
Article on Miss Ireland

External links

 

Beauty pageants in Ireland
Irish awards
Ireland